Lac Pau (Caniapiscau) Water Aerodrome  is located on Lac Pau near Caniapiscau, Quebec, Canada.

See also
Caniapiscau Aerodrome

References

Registered aerodromes in Côte-Nord
Seaplane bases in Quebec